The London, Midland and Scottish Railway had the largest stock of steam locomotives of any of the 'Big Four' Grouping, i.e. pre-Nationalisation railway companies in the UK. Despite early troubles arising from factions within the new company, the LMS went on to build some very successful designs; many lasted until the end of steam traction on British Railways in 1968. For an explanation of numbering and classification, see British Rail locomotive and multiple unit numbering and classification.

Various locomotives were inherited from pre-grouping companies. Those from the smaller railways, and hence non-standard, were withdrawn quite early, while ex-Midland, LNWR and L&YR types persisted.

The Midland had long had a 'small engine policy', i.e. it preferred small engines hauling frequent, fairly short trains, and employing a second locomotive (double-heading) where necessary. Unfortunately this practice, while emininently suitable for the route from Sheffield, Derby and Nottingham to London was not at all suited to the route from Euston to Glasgow via Crewe, Preston and Carlisle (the 'West Coast Main Line') and it took several years to convince the senior staff responsible for such matters that this was the case.

The first sign of the change was the Royal Scot 4-6-0 class of 1927, officially designed by Fowler, but actually designed by the North British Locomotive Company with approval from Henry Fowler. Nevertheless, the majority of designs continued to be very much Midland in character.

This changed when William Stanier arrived. His large, streamlined 'Princess Coronation' class engines were iconic and flew the flag for the LMS against the competing Class A4 of the London and North Eastern Railway.

Locomotives acquired from constituent companies 
See LMS locomotive numbering and classification for an explanation of the numbers allocated to inherited locomotives and the power classification system used below.

Ex-Midland Railway 

The Midland shaped the subsequent LMS locomotive policy until 1933.  Its locomotives (which it always referred to as engines) followed a corporate small engine policy, with numerous class 2F, 3F and 4F 0-6-0s for goods work, 2P and 4P 4-4-0s for passenger work, and 0-4-4T and 0-6-0T tank engines.  The only exceptions to this were its 0-10-0 banking engine for Lickey Incline on its Bristol-Birmingham line, and the 7F 2-8-0 goods engines built by the Midland at their Derby locomotive works for the Somerset and Dorset Joint Railway.

Ex-London and North Western Railway

The LNWR did not have a significant impact on LMS policy as the Midland, although it did inspire the Fowler-built 7F.

Ex-Lancashire & Yorkshire Railway

Ex-North Staffordshire Railway

The North Staffordshire Railway handed over 192 standard gauge engines into the LMS capital stock.

In addition to the above, also added to the capital stock were the three NSR 0-2-2 railmotors numbered 1–3.  These were not renumbered by the LMS before scrapping in 1927.

There were two other additions to the capital stock, the two locomotives of the  narrow gauge Leek and Manifold Valley Light Railway.  These two engines, number 1 E.R. Calthrop and number 2 J.B. Earle kept both their names and numbers under the LMS.

Four locomotives were added to the LMS service stock.  Standard gauge 0-4-0 battery electric locomotive, built in 1917, and three,  gauge, 0-4-0ST locomotives called Frog, Toad and Bob that worked the Caldon Low tramway, owned by the NSR.  None of these locomotives were numbered by the LMS.

Ex-Caledonian Railway

The class number used for Caledonian Railway engines was the stock number of the first member of the class to reach traffic. Hence earlier numbered classes could well have appeared later in time.

Ex-Furness Railway

The Furness Railway was a small company with a correspondingly small locomotive stock. It is known best for the Baltic tanks (which seemed to be a little more successful than the Lancashire and Yorkshire Railway examples of the same arrangement). The Baltics did not survive for long. The only class that survived as far as nationalisation were some moderate sized 0-6-0 tender engines classified '3F' by the LMS and as D5 by Bob Rush. Six were still in traffic as of 31 August 1948.

Ex-Glasgow and South Western Railway

Ex-Highland Railway

Hughes (1923–1925)

George Hughes, formerly of the L&YR, became the first Chief Mechanical Engineer (CME) of the LMS.  However, he retired just two years later in 1925.  His one new design was a class of mixed traffic moguls known as "crabs".

 Class 5MT "Crab" 2-6-0
 Class 5P Dreadnought tank 4-6-4T, Designed for L&YR, built by the LMS.

He also built small numbers of slightly modified versions of pre-grouping designs including:

 Caledonian Railway 60 Class
 Caledonian Railway 439 Class
 LT&SR 79 Class

Fowler (1925–1931)
Sir Henry Fowler, deputy CME under Hughes, was formerly CME of the Midland Railway.  He was largely responsible for the adoption of the Midland's small engines as LMS standards.  This led to a crisis as these were underpowered.  However, some moves towards larger engines were made, particularly through the Royal Scots and Garratts.  At the end of Fowler's reign, Ernest Lemon briefly took over as CME, but was quickly promoted to make room for William Stanier.

 LMS Class 2P 4-4-0
 LMS Class 2F "Dock Tank" 0-6-0T
 LMS Class 3MT 2-6-2T
 LMS Class 3F "Jinty" 0-6-0T
 LMS Class 4P "Compound" 4-4-0
 LMS Class 4MT 2-6-4T
 LMS Class 4F "Derby Four" 0-6-0
 LMS Class 7F 0-8-0
 LMS Class 6P "Patriot" 4-6-0
 LMS Class 7P "Royal Scot" 4-6-0
 LMS Garratt 2-6-0+0-6-2
 LMS 6399 Fury

Stock taken in from the Somerset and Dorset Joint Railway 

The Somerset and Dorset Joint Railway was jointly owned by the LMS and the Southern with the LMS responsible for locomotive affairs.  However, its locomotives were kept separate until 1928 when they were taken into LMS stock.  These mostly consisted of standard Midland types constructed by the Midland and the LMS.  The S&DJR 7F 2-8-0, however, was specific to the line.

 S&DJR 7F 2-8-0
 S&DJR Sentinels
 and other Midland types.

Stanier (1932–1944)

William Stanier arrived in 1932 from the Great Western Railway and, with the backing of Josiah Stamp, reversed the small engine policy.

 LMS Class 2P 0-4-4T
 LMS Class 3MT 2-6-2T
 LMS Class 4MT 2-6-4T (two- and three-cylindered)
 LMS Class 5MT 2-6-0
 LMS Class 5MT "Black Five" 4-6-0
 LMS Class 6P "Jubilee" 4-6-0
 LMS Class 8P "Princess Coronation" 4-6-2
 LMS Class 8P "Princess Royal" 4-6-2
 LMS Class 8F 2-8-0
 LMS Turbomotive
 LMS Class 6P Rebuilt Jubilee
 LMS Class 7P Rebuilt Royal Scot

Fairburn (1944–1945)
Charles Fairburn was somewhat restricted by the rules applied to the railway companies by the war situation (not to mention the fact that Stanier had left things in a state that required little or no new design). He was responsible for the construction of a number of locomotives to Stanier designs (mainly the 8F 2-8-0 and 5MT 4-6-0) and some detailed design variations on the latter. He died of a heart attack in October 1945.
 LMS Class 4MT 2-6-4T

Ivatt (1946–1947)
George Ivatt, son of the former GNR CME Henry Ivatt, became CME in 1946.  He continued building some Stanier types, but introduced some low-powered class 2 engines and a medium-powered class 4 mixed traffic design.  A pair of main line diesels were also produced.

 LMS Class 2MT 2-6-0
 LMS Class 2MT 2-6-2T
 LMS Class 4MT 2-6-0
 NCC Class WT 2-6-4T, based on the Fowler 2-6-4T design of 1927.
 
 LMS Class 5MT "Black Five" 4-6-0 (modified version)
 LMS Class 6P "Rebuilt Patriot" 4-6-0
 LMS Class 8P "Princess Coronation" 4-6-2 (modified version)

Modern Traction
The LMS experimented with various forms of non-steam locomotives, and pioneered the use of diesel locomotives in Great Britain.
 LMS diesel locomotives
 LMS diesel shunters
 LMS diesel shunter 1831
 LMS petrol shunters
 LMS railcars

Post-Nationalisation
LMS locomotive design should have ended in 1948 at Nationalisation, but had enormous influence over the design of British Railways' 'Standard' steam locomotives by former LMS man R.A. Riddles. Some of the designs were little changed from the comparable designs by Ivatt.

Riddles built quite a few examples of designs from the 'Big Four', including most of the Fairburn/Ivatt tank engines. These were distributed around the system, with quite a few of the 2-6-2 designs going to the Southern Region.

Withdrawal
Pre-grouping types were withdrawn early for being non-standard, and locomotives were routinely withdrawn after their lives expired.

Withdrawal of locomotives generally did not take place until the great locomotive cull of British Railways in the period 1962–1966.  A pair of "Black Fives" were the last steam locomotives to be run on British Railways in 1968, although since then there have been almost weekly charter runs for the enthusiast and tourist markets and the occasional timetabled service (for instance at Dawlish and Stratford-upon-Avon).

Preservation

A significant number of LMS locomotives have been preserved:

Three LMS Hughes Crabs
Nine LMS Class 3F "Jinty" 0-6-0Ts
Three LMS Class 4F 0-6-0s
Two LMS Royal Scot Class
One LMS 3-Cylindered Stanier 2-6-4T
One LMS Stanier Mogul
Eighteen Black Fives
Four LMS Jubilee Class
Two LMS Princess Royal Class
Three LMS Princess Coronation Class pacifics
Fifteen LMS Stanier Class 8Fs
Two LMS Fairburn 2-6-4Ts
Seven LMS Ivatt Class 2 2-6-0s
Four LMS Ivatt Class 2 2-6-2Ts
One LMS Ivatt Class 4

A smaller number of pre-grouping locomotives inherited by the LMS have also been preserved.

See also
 List of LMS locomotives as of 31 December 1947

References

Notes

Bibliography
 
 
 
 
 
 

 
British railway-related lists